Anthony Michael Fadell (born March 22, 1969) is an American engineer, designer, entrepreneur, and investor. He was senior vice president of the iPod division at Apple Inc. and founder and former CEO of Nest Labs.

Fadell joined Apple Inc. in 2001 and oversaw all iPod hardware, software, and accessories development. He is known as the "father of the iPod". As the co-creator of the iPhone, he also worked on the first three generations of the iPhone and oversaw all iPhone hardware, firmware, and accessories development from March 2006 to November 2008.

In May 2010, he co-founded Nest Labs, which announced its first product, the Nest Learning Thermostat, in October 2011.  Nest was acquired by Google in January 2014 for $3.2B.

Fadell has authored more than 300 patents and was named one of Time'''s "100 Most Influential People in the World" in 2014. In 2016 Time named the Nest Learning Thermostat, the iPod and the iPhone as three of the “50 Most Influential Gadgets of All Time".

Fadell is the Principal at Future Shape, a global investment and advisory firm coaching 200+ startups working on foundational deep technology.

 Education and early life 
Fadell was born March 22, 1969, to a Lebanese father and a mother of Russian and Polish origin. His father was a sales executive at Levi Strauss and Co. Fadell is an alumnus of Grosse Pointe South High School in Grosse Pointe Farms, Michigan. He graduated from the University of Michigan with a BS in Computer Engineering in 1991. While still at University of Michigan, he was CEO of Constructive Instruments, which marketed MediaText, multimedia composition software for children.

 Career 

Early career
After college, Fadell worked for Apple spinoff General Magic for three years, working with Sony, Philips, Matsushita, Toshiba and other consumer electronics firms in the "General Magic Alliance" to develop a line of personal handheld communicators. Starting in 1992 as a diagnostics engineer and progressing to a systems architect, he was responsible for the development of a number of technologies and devices, including the Sony Magic Link and Motorola Envoy, both of which were part of the Magic Cap platform.

Philips Electronics
In 1995, he was hired by Philips where he co-founded their Mobile Computing Group and served as the Chief Technology Officer, and Director of Engineering. He developed a number of Windows CE-based hand-held devices, notably the Philips Velo and Nino PDA. Fadell went on to become a Vice President of Philips Strategy and Ventures where he was in charge of developing Philips's digital audio strategy consisting of technology direction for silicon and software, as well as its investment portfolio and potential business models.

In July 1999, Fadell started his own company called Fuse to develop the "Dell of the Consumer Electronics". One of the devices he had in mind was a small hard disk-based music player and an online-store-for-music. Fuse failed, however, to find a second round of funding, and Fadell started exploring developing the product at other companies. He first approached RealNetworks in 2000 but left after only six weeks.

Apple Inc.
Fadell found support for his business idea of an MP3 player complemented by an online music store in Apple. In 2001 Fadell was hired by Apple as a contractor designing the iPod and planning Apple's audio product strategy. His idea for a small hard disk-based music player and an online-store-for-music had caught Steve Jobs's attention. During that time, he created the concept and initial design of the iPod. He was then hired by Apple to assemble and run its iPod & Special Projects group in April 2001. He was tasked with overseeing the design and production of the iPod and iSight devices.

Due to the engineers and resources at Apple being constrained with the Mac line, Fadell hired engineers from his startup company, Fuse, and veteran engineers from General Magic and Philips to build the core iPod development team. He also hired an outside company to develop the software for the player.

He was promoted to vice president of iPod engineering in 2004 and on October 14, 2005, Apple announced that Fadell would replace the retiring Jon Rubinstein as Senior Vice President of the iPod Division on March 31, 2006. Fadell became the co-creator of the iPhone, working on the first three generations of the iPhone and overseeing all iPhone hardware, firmware, and accessories development from March 2006 to November 2008.

On November 3, 2008, The Wall Street Journal broke the story of Fadell's departure from Apple.

 Nest Labs, Inc. 

While building his energy-efficient home near Lake Tahoe in California, Fadell searched for a thermostat and was frustrated by the limited features, high cost and lack of energy efficiency gains provided by available devices. After he left Apple, he spent time around the world and realized people everywhere were having similar energy saving dilemmas as he was in his Tahoe house. Fadell developed the business plan for Nest while living in Paris.

Together with Matt Rogers, a former Apple colleague, he set out to redesign the traditional thermostat. In May 2010, Fadell and Rogers co-founded Nest Labs in Palo Alto, CA. Nest Labs, or Nest, a company that designs and manufactures a sensor-driven, Wi-Fi-enabled, learning programmable thermostat, was acquired by Google in January 2014 for $3.2B. Fadell announced his resignation from Nest on June 3, 2016.

 Future Shape 
Fadell is Principal at Future Shape, a global advisory and investment firm coaching engineers and scientists working on foundational deep technology. He has been coaching founders and investing in their startups for the better part of the past decade. With 200+ startups in its portfolio, Future Shape seeks to bring technology out of the lab and into our lives. Fadell and his team at Future Shape coach startups to get the fundamentals right for lasting innovation. Tony believes that the first trillionaire in the world is someone who’s going to fix climate change.

Author
His book Build: An Unorthodox Guide to Making Things Worth Making was released May 3, 2022. Build has been named a New York Times, Wall Street Journal, and USA Today best seller.

Awards and recognition
In 2012, he was the recipient of the Alva Award, honoring him as "the next great serial inventor". Vanity Fair also recognized him as a trailblazer on their 2012 Next Establishment list. In 2013, Fadell was acknowledged as one of Business Insider's Top 75 Designers in Technology, Fast Company's 100 Most Creative People, and CNBC's Top 50 Disruptors.

Overview of awards and recognitions:

 (2004) University of Michigan, College of Engineering's alumnus of the year award
(2012) Alva Award, "The Next Great Serial Inventor"
 (2012) (2013) (2014) Vanity Fair, Next Establishment list
 (2013) Business Insider, Top 75 Designers in Technology
 (2013) Fast Company, 100 Most Creative People
 (2013) CNBC, Top 50 Disruptors
 (2013) Fortune, Trailblazers: 11 people changing business
 (2014) Fortune, The World's Top 25 Eco-Innovators
 (2014) Time, 100 Most Influential People in the World
 (2014) CNN, CNN 10: Thinkers
 (2014) Golden Plate Award, American Academy of Achievement, presented by Awards Council member George Lucas
(2016), Time'' named the Nest Learning Thermostat, the iPod and the iPhone as three of the “50 Most Influential Gadgets of All Time

References

External links
 TED Talk

1969 births
Living people
American designers
American people of Lebanese descent
American people of Polish descent
American technology chief executives
American technology company founders
Apple Inc. employees
Apple Inc. executives
Google employees
University of Michigan College of Engineering alumni
Alphabet Inc. people
21st-century American inventors
Psi Upsilon